William Meade Prince (July 9, 1893 – November 10, 1951) was an American magazine illustrator of the 1920s and 1930s. The William Meade Prince and Lillian Hughes Prince Papers form part of the Southern Historical Collection of the University of North Carolina.

Selected publications
 The Southern Part of Heaven (1950)

References

External links 

1893 births
1951 deaths
American magazine illustrators
People from Roanoke, Virginia
University of North Carolina at Chapel Hill faculty
Suicides by firearm in North Carolina
1951 suicides